Laufenburg may refer to:

Places 
 Laufenburg, Germany
 Laufenburg, Aargau, a commune of the canton of Aargau, Switzerland
 Laufenburg District, a district of the canton of Aargau, Switzerland

Family name 
 Habsburg-Laufenburg

See also 
 Laufenberg